Study of a Young Woman (also known as Portrait of a Young Woman, or Girl with a Veil) is a painting by the Dutch artist  Johannes Vermeer, completed between 1665 and 1667, and now in the Metropolitan Museum of Art, New York.

The painting was painted around the same time as the better-known Girl with a Pearl Earring, and has a near-identical size. Because of this, and its proximity in tone and composition, it is sometimes considered to be either a variant or pendant painting (counterpart) of Girl with a Pearl Earring. The subjects of both paintings wear pearl earrings, have scarves draped over their shoulders, and are shown in front of a plain black background. In addition, it has been suggested (though this has also been widely contested) that the creation of both works involved the use of some optical device, such as a camera obscura or mirror, as the Hockney–Falco thesis speculates.

Description
The sitter is depicted as having a homely face—widely spaced and flat—with a small nose and thin lips on a relatively large head. The lack of idealised beauty has led to a general belief that this work was painted on commission, although it is possible that the model was Vermeer's daughter. The artist probably used a live model but, as with Girl with a Pearl Earring, did not create the work as a portrait, but as a tronie, a Dutch word meaning "visage" or "expression", a type of Dutch 17th-century picture appreciated for its "unusual costumes, intriguing physiognomies, suggestion of personality, and demonstration of artistic skill". The picture encourages the viewer to be curious about the young woman's thoughts, feelings, or character, something typical in many of Vermeer's paintings.

Girl with a Pearl Earring and Portrait of a Young Woman are unusual for Vermeer in that they lack his usual rich background; instead the girls are framed by a background of deep black. This isolating effect seems to heighten their vulnerability and seeming desire to place trust in the viewer. In 1994, the art historian Edward Snow wrote that Portrait of a Young Woman conveys "the desire for beauty and perfection into a loving acceptance of what is flawed".

Provenance and exhibitions
The painting may have been owned by Pieter Claesz van Ruijven of Delft before 1674, then by his widow, Maria de Knuijt of Delft, until 1681; then their daughter, Magdalena van Ruijven, until 1682; her widower, Jacob Dissius, until 1695. The painting is thought to have been part of the Dissius sale of May 16, 1696 (No. 38, 39 or 40). It probably then belonged to Dr. Luchtmans, who sold it in Rotterdam as part of a sale from April 20–22, 1816 (No. 92) for 3 Dutch guilders (about 30 grams of silver), even then a tiny amount.<ref name=gr>Reitlinger, Gerald; The Economics of Taste, Vol I: The Rise and Fall of Picture Prices 1760–1960. 484. Barrie and Rockliffe, London, 1961</ref> Prince Auguste Marie Raymond d'Arenberg, of Brussels, owned the painting by 1829, and it remained in his family, in Brussels and Schloss Meppen, from 1833 to the early 1950s. In 1959 (or 1955, according to another source), it was bought in a private sale from the Prince d'Arenberg by Mr. Charles Wrightsman and Mrs. Jayne Wrightsman of New York for a sum estimated at around £125,000. In 1979, the Wrightsmans donated the picture to the Metropolitan Museum of Art in memory of curator Theodore Rousseau, Jr.

References

Sources
 
 
 
 
 
 

Further reading

External linksStudy of a Young Woman at the website of the Metropolitan Museum of Art
The Milkmaid by Johannes Vermeer, exhibition catalog fully online as PDF from The Metropolitan Museum of Art, which contains material on Portrait of a Young Woman (cat. no. 9)
Notable acquisitions 1979–1980, fully digitized online as PDF from The Metropolitan Museum of Art, which contains material on Portrait of a Young Woman'' (pp. 41–42)

Genre paintings by Johannes Vermeer
1660s paintings
Paintings in the collection of the Metropolitan Museum of Art
Young Woman (Vermeer)